The Eparchy of Banja Luka is an eparchy (diocese) of the Serbian Orthodox Church with its seat in Banja Luka, Bosnia and Herzegovina. It has jurisdiction over the north-western regions of Bosnia and Herzegovina.

History
Until 1900, territory of this eparchy  belonged to the Eastern Orthodox Metropolitanate of Dabar and Bosnia, which in turn was under the ecclesiastical jurisdiction of the Ecumenical Patriarchate of Constantinople. Upon the request of the Eastern Orthodox Serbs of this region, new Eparchy of Banja Luka was created in that year, with seat in the city of Banja Luka. Bishop of Banja Luka was granted the honorary title of Metropolitan, as was the custom in Ecumenical Patriarchate of Constantinople. 

In 1918, all Orthodox bishops in Bosnia and Herzegovina reached a unanimous decision to join with other Serbian ecclesiastical provinces into united Serbian Orthodox Church. Arrangements with the Ecumenical Patriarchate were made, and the canonical process of unification was completed in 1920. Since then, Eparchy of Banja Luka has been part of the Serbian Orthodox Church.

Heads

Monasteries
Gomionica Monastery
Liplje Monastery
Stuplje Monastery

See also
List of the Eparchies of the Serbian Orthodox Church

References

Bibliography

External links
 Serbian Orthodox Church 

Religious sees of the Serbian Orthodox Church
Serbian Orthodox Church in Bosnia and Herzegovina
Religion in Republika Srpska
Dioceses established in the 19th century